The Battle of Gettysburg is a 1913 American silent war film directed by Charles Giblyn and Thomas H. Ince. The Battle of Gettysburg is based on the American Civil War battle of the same name. The film is now considered to be lost, although some battlefield footage was used by Mack Sennett in his comedy Cohen Saves the Flag, which was shot on location alongside this production.  However, there are claims that The Battle of Gettysburg was screened in France in 1973.

Cast
 Willard Mack in an undetermined leading role
 Charles Edler as Abraham Lincoln
 Ann Little as Virginia Burke as the Confederate Sister (credited as Anna Little)
 Joe King as Jack Lamar as the Confederate Brother
 Burton L. King as Jim Burke (the sister's sweetheart)
 Herschel Mayall
 Walter Edwards
 J. Barney Sherry
 George Fisher
 J. Frank Burke
 Enid Markey
 Gertrude Claire in a secondary role (unconfirmed)
 Shorty Hamilton in a secondary role (unconfirmed)

See also
 List of lost films

References

External links
 
 

1913 films
1913 war films
1913 lost films
American epic films
American Civil War films
American war films
American silent feature films
American black-and-white films
Battle of Gettysburg
Depictions of Abraham Lincoln on film
Films directed by Charles Giblyn
Films directed by Thomas H. Ince
Films set in the 1860s
Films shot in California
Lost American films
Lost war films
1910s American films
Silent adventure films
1910s English-language films